"Wake Up Lovin' You" is a song written by Josh Osborne, Matthew Ramsey and Trevor Rosen, and sung by American country music singer Craig Morgan.  It was released in July 2013 as the first single from his compilation album The Journey (Livin' Hits).

Content
The song is a midtempo ballad about a man who, despite being parted from his lover, is unable to forget her despite his actions.

Morgan told The Boot that "I really believe that this will be the song of my career, because it’s a turning point."

Critical reception
Giving it a "B+", Joseph Hudak of Country Weekly compared the song's theme favorably to "Sunday Mornin' Comin' Down" by Kris Kristofferson, and said that the song was "dark stuff" for Morgan. It received 4 out of 5 stars from Billy Dukes of Taste of Country, who wrote that "The strength of the vocals rub against the vulnerability of the lyrics and story. The production plays a role in creating this big sturdy ballad, as well."

Music video
Kristin Barlowe directed the song's music video.

Chart performance
The song received sufficient airplay to enter the Country Airplay chart at No. 57 for the chart dated July 27, 2013.  It debuted on the Hot Country Songs at No. 48 on November 16, 2013.  The song has sold 243,000 copies in the U.S. as of May 2014.

Year-end charts

Covers
Two of the original songwriters, Matthew Ramsey and Trevor Rosen, are members of the band Old Dominion, who perform the song regularly at concerts and has recorded their own cover.

References

2013 singles
2013 songs
Country ballads
2010s ballads
Craig Morgan songs
Black River Entertainment singles
Songs written by Josh Osborne
Songs written by Trevor Rosen
Songs written by Matthew Ramsey